Edson Aldair García Martínez (born 1 March 1998) is a Mexican professional footballer who plays as a defender.

International career
García was included in the under-21 roster that participated in the 2018 Toulon Tournament, where Mexico would finish runners-up.

Career statistics

Club

Honours
Tampico Madero
Liga de Expansión MX: Guardianes 2020

References

1998 births
Living people
Association football defenders
Liga MX players
Atlas F.C. footballers
C.D. Veracruz footballers
Footballers from San Luis Potosí
People from Rioverde, San Luis Potosí
Mexican footballers